is located on the island of Shimojishima in Miyakojima, Okinawa Prefecture, Japan.  It has the longest runway of any island in Japan south of the main island of Okinawa.  Mitsubishi has built a low cost carrier terminal which began operating passenger flights in March 2019.

The prefecture operates the airport, which has been classified as a Third Class airport (otherwise known as a Type-3) since May 1979.

History
The airport, also known as Shimoji Airport, was originally built as a 'training airport' for commercial pilots, with a secondary role as a (planned) alternative landing site for intercontinental supersonic airliners. It was completed in 1971, a year before Okinawa reverted to Japanese control. It was officially opened in July 1973, initially as a private airport.

On July 22, 1994 Japan Transocean Air suspended flights.

From 2001 onwards, the U.S. Marine Corps occasionally used the airport as a stopover point for helicopters and tanker aircraft involved in regional exercises.

In 2004, there were some protests over the use of the airport as a refueling stop by USMC helicopters returning from an exercise in the Philippines. Adding to concerns were reports that the airport was being looked at in connection with a new base for units that were to be displaced by the planned relocation of the Futenma base. The airport is currently listed as a CSL (Cooperative Security Location) by the US DOD.
  
As of 2005, the airport was in use as a training facility for Japan Airlines and All Nippon Airways. The long runway makes the facility well-suited for "touch-and-go landing" practice maneuvers. In the same year, the then local (Irabu Town) assembly submitted a proposal to the then Defense Agency, requesting that the JASDF take over the airport as one of their bases.

In 2010, there were renewed protests against proposals to turn Shimoji Airport into a permanent USMC post.

As of early 2013, serious consideration was being given to basing a detachment of JASDF F-15J fighters out of the Airport, in order to provide better air defense coverage over the Senkaku Islands. The airport already has a 'shadow designation' as Shimoji Air Base as part of its Type-3 status.

Airlines and destinations

Popular culture

In the anime Stratos 4, set in an alternate timeline, Shimojishima Airport had become Shimoji Airbase sometime after the year 1984. This is home to the Shimoji MS (Meteor Sweeper) Squadron, part of an international planetary defence organisation.

References

External links

 Shimojijima Airport
 Miyako Shimojishima Airport Terminal
 
 

Airports in Okinawa
Japan Air Self-Defense Force bases
Japan Self-Defense Forces